The 1979 United Kingdom general election was held on Thursday 3 May 1979 to elect 635 members to the House of Commons.

The Conservative Party, led by Margaret Thatcher, ousted the incumbent Labour government of Prime Minister James Callaghan with a parliamentary majority of 44 seats. The election was the first of four consecutive election victories for the Conservative Party, and Thatcher became the United Kingdom's and Europe's first elected female head of government, marking the beginning of 18 years in government for the Conservatives and 18 years in opposition for Labour. Unusually, the date chosen coincided with the 1979 local elections. The local government results provided some source of comfort to the Labour Party, who recovered some lost ground from local election reversals in previous years, despite losing the general election. The parish council elections were pushed back a few weeks.

The previous parliamentary term had begun in October 1974, when Harold Wilson led Labour to a majority of three seats, seven months after forming a minority government following a hung parliament and the failure of Edward Heath's Conservative government to form a coalition with the Liberals. Wilson had previously led the party in government from October 1964 to June 1970, and had served as party leader since February 1963.

However, after just two years back in Downing Street he had resigned as Prime Minister, and was succeeded by James Callaghan, and within a year the government's narrow parliamentary majority had gone. Callaghan made agreements with the Liberals and later the Ulster Unionists, as well as the Scottish and Welsh nationalists, in order to remain in power. This pact lasted until July 1978.

However, on 28 March 1979, following the defeat of the Scottish devolution referendum, Thatcher tabled a motion of no confidence in Callaghan's Labour government, which was passed by just one vote (311 to 310), triggering a general election five months before the end of the government's term.

The Labour campaign was hampered by a series of industrial disputes and strikes during the winter of 1978–79, known as the Winter of Discontent, and the party focused its campaign on support for the National Health Service and full employment. After intense media speculation that a general election would be held before the end of 1978, Callaghan had announced early in the autumn of that year that a general election would not take place that year, having received private polling data which suggested a parliamentary majority was unlikely.

The Conservative campaign employed the advertising agency Saatchi & Saatchi, and pledged to control inflation as well as curbing the power of the trade unions. The Conservatives also ran their campaign on the theme that "Labour Isn't Working" (unemployment reached a 40-year high of 1.5 million during 1978). The Liberal Party was damaged by allegations that its former leader Jeremy Thorpe had been involved in a homosexual affair, and had conspired to murder his former lover. The Liberals were now being led by David Steel, meaning that all three major parties entered the election with a new leader.

The election saw a 5.2% swing from Labour to the Conservatives, the largest swing since the 1945 election, which Clement Attlee won for Labour. Margaret Thatcher became Prime Minister, and Callaghan was replaced as Labour leader by Michael Foot in 1980. Results for the election were broadcast live on the BBC, and presented by David Dimbleby and Robin Day, with Robert McKenzie on the "Swingometer", and further analysis provided by David Butler. It was the first general election to feature Rick Wakeman's song "Arthur" during the BBC's coverage.

Because of the anaemic economic and social backdrop in this election, it presaged the 1980 United States presidential election which occurred in 18 months later in which under similar circumstances, incumbent US President Jimmy Carter, like James Callaghan, was also defeated by Republican challenger Ronald Reagan, an advocate of similar socioeconomic policies in the United States to Margaret Thatcher's Britain.

Future Prime Minister John Major, who went on to succeed Thatcher in November 1990, entered Parliament at this election, retaining the Huntingdonshire seat in Cambridgeshire for the Conservatives. Jeremy Thorpe, Shirley Williams and Barbara Castle were all among the members of parliament who resigned or lost their seats.

Timeline 
After suffering a vote of no confidence on 28 March 1979, Prime Minister James Callaghan was forced to announce that he would request a dissolution of Parliament to bring about a general election. The key dates were as follows:

Background 
Britain's economy during the 1970s was so weak that Labour minister James Callaghan warned his fellow Cabinet members in 1974 of the possibility of "a breakdown of democracy", telling them: "If I were a young man, I would emigrate." Callaghan succeeded Harold Wilson as the Labour prime minister after the latter's surprise resignation in April 1976. By March 1977, Labour had become a minority government after two by-election defeats cost them the three-seat majority they had won in October 1974, and from March 1977 to August 1978 Callaghan governed by an agreement with the Liberal Party through the Lib–Lab pact. Callaghan had considered calling an election in the autumn of 1978, but ultimately decided that imminent tax cuts, and a possible economic upturn in 1979, could favour his party at the polls and delayed the election until the following year. Although published opinion polls suggested that he might win, private polls commissioned by the Labour Party from MORI had suggested the two main parties had much the same level of support.

However, events would soon overtake the Labour government and prove Callaghan's decision to delay an election to be a costly mistake. A series of industrial disputes in the winter of 1978–79, dubbed the "Winter of Discontent", led to widespread strikes across the country and seriously hurt Labour's standings in the polls while boosting support for the Conservative opposition. When the Scottish National Party (SNP) withdrew support for the Scotland Act 1978, a vote of no confidence was held and passed by one vote on 28 March 1979, forcing Callaghan to call a general election. As the previous election had been held in October 1974, Labour could have held on until the autumn of 1979 if it had not been for the lost confidence vote.

Margaret Thatcher had won her party's 1975 leadership election over former leader Edward Heath, taking over the leadership of the party in February 1975, four months after the party's failure to win the October 1974 election. Heath had led the party for a decade but lost three of the four elections he contested.

David Steel had replaced Jeremy Thorpe as leader of the Liberal Party in 1976, after allegations of homosexuality and conspiracy to murder his former lover forced Thorpe to resign. The Thorpe affair led to a fall in the Liberal vote, after what had been thought to be a breakthrough in the February 1974 election.

Campaign 
This was the first election since 1959 to feature three new leaders for the main political parties. The three main parties all advocated cutting income tax. Labour and the Conservatives did not specify the exact thresholds of income tax they would implement but the Liberals did, claiming they would have income tax starting at 20% with a top rate of 50%.

Without explicitly mentioning Thatcher's sex, Callaghan was (as Christian Caryl later wrote) "a master at sardonically implying that whatever the leader of the opposition said was made even sillier by the fact that it was said by a woman". Thatcher used the tactics that had defeated her other male opponents: constantly studying, sleeping only a few hours a night, and exploiting her femininity to appear as someone who understood housewives' household budgets.

A proposal for the two main party leaders to participate in two televised debates was put forward by former Labour MP turned broadcaster Brian Walden. These would have been produced by LWT and were planned to be shown on ITV on 22 & 29 April 1979. While James Callaghan immediately accepted Walden's proposal, Margaret Thatcher decided to "wait a few days before replying" to the invitation. According to The Glasgow Herald, Some of Mrs Thatcher's advisers were concerned that she had more to lose from such debates, fearing that it would lead to a "presidential-style 'Her or me' campaign" which would see policy issues become of less importance. However it was also reported that the danger of declining was that Mrs Thatcher would be charged by Labour as being "scared" to face the Prime Minister. At the insistence of the Liberals, their leader David Steel was also invited by LWT to take part, and accepted the offer. However, Mrs Thatcher declined the offer to take part, saying that the election was for a government, not a president, which meant that the debates did not go ahead.

Labour 
The Labour campaign reiterated their support for the National Health Service and full employment and focused on the damage they believed the Conservatives would do to the country. In an early campaign broadcast, Callaghan asked: "The question you will have to consider is whether we risk tearing everything up by the roots." Towards the end of Labour's campaign, Callaghan claimed a Conservative government "would sit back and just allow firms to go bankrupt and jobs to be lost in the middle of a world recession" and that the Conservatives were "too big a gamble to take".

The Labour Party manifesto, The Labour way is the better way, was issued on 6 April. Callaghan presented four priorities:
"We must keep a curb on inflation and prices";
"we will carry forward the task of putting into practice the new framework to improve industrial relations that we have hammered out with the TUC";
"we  a high priority to working for a return to full employment";
"we are deeply concerned to enlarge people's freedom"; and "we will use Britain's influence to strengthen world peace and defeat world poverty".

Conservatives 
The Conservatives campaigned on economic issues, pledging to control inflation and to reduce the increasing power of the trade unions who supported mass strikes. They also employed the advertising agency Saatchi & Saatchi who had created the "Labour Isn't Working" poster.

The Conservative campaign was focused on gaining support from traditional Labour voters who had never voted Conservative before, first-time voters, and people who had voted Liberal in 1974. Thatcher's advisers, Gordon Reece and Timothy Bell, co-ordinated their presentation with the editor of The Sun, Larry Lamb. The Sun printed a series of articles by disillusioned former Labour ministers (Reg Prentice, Richard Marsh, Lord George-Brown, Alfred Robens and Lord Chalfont) detailing why they had switched their support to Thatcher. She explicitly asked Labour voters for their support when she launched her campaign in Cardiff, claiming that Labour was now extreme. Choosing to start her campaign in the strongly Labour-supporting city was part of Thatcher's strategy of appealing to skilled manual workers (NRS social group C2), whom both parties had previously seen as certain Labour voters; she thought that many of these would support her promises to reduce unions' power and enact the Right to Buy their homes. On 29 April the Conservatives held a massive rally in London for Conservative trade unionists. The Glasgow Herald called it an "astonishing rally" which it likened to "the razza-matazz of an American presidential-stye jamboree" and stated "Nothing quite like it has been seen before in a General Election in Britain." Several celebrities including Lulu, Molly Weir and Nigel Davenport appeared to support Thatcher and the Conservatives, while others like Eric Sykes and Les Dawson sent messages of support. It was also announced former Labour MP Eddie Griffiths was backing the Conservatives against his former party.

An analysis of the election result showed that the Conservatives gained an 11% swing among the skilled working class (the C2s) and a 9% swing amongst the unskilled working class (the DEs).

Thatcher's stance on immigration in the late 1970s (following the vast immigration from Asian and African-Caribbean nations during the 1950s and 1960s) was perceived as part of a rising racist public discourse, As Leader of the Opposition, Thatcher believed that the National Front (NF) was winning over large numbers of Conservative voters with warnings against floods of immigrants. Her strategy was to undermine the NF narrative by acknowledging that many of its voters had serious concerns in need of addressing. The National Front had a relatively small following and did not win any seats in parliament.

Thatcher criticised Labour immigration policy in January 1978, with the goal of attracting voters away from the NF and to the Conservatives. Her rhetoric was followed by an increase in Conservative support at the expense of the NF. Critics on the left reacted by accusing her of pandering to racism. Sociologists Mark Mitchell and Dave Russell responded that Thatcher had been badly misinterpreted, arguing that race was never an important focus of Thatcherism. Throughout her premiership both major parties took similar positions on immigration policy, having in 1981 passed the British Nationality Act with bipartisan support. No policies aimed at restricting immigration were passed or proposed by her government, and the subject of race was never highlighted by Thatcher in any of her major speeches as Prime Minister. Although Thatcher had pledged to address concerns felt by NF voters including matters related to immigration and presided over a period of disaffected race relations early in her premiership, the Conservative Party under her leadership actively began reaching out to ethnic minority voters ahead of the 1983 general election.

The Conservative manifesto, drafted by Chris Patten and Adam Ridley and edited by Angus Maude, reflected Thatcher's views and was issued on 11 April. It promised five major policies:
"to restore the health of our economic and social life, by controlling inflation and striking a fair balance between the rights and duties of the trade union movement";
"to restore incentives so that hard work pays, success is rewarded and genuine new jobs are created in an expanding economy";
"to uphold Parliament and the rule of law";
"to support family life, by helping people to become home-owners, raising the standards of their children's education and concentrating welfare services on the effective support of the old, the sick, the disabled and those who are in real need"; and
"to strengthen Britain's defences and work with our allies to protect our interests in an increasingly threatening world".

Opinion polling

Results 
In the end, the overall swing of 5.2% was the largest since 1945, and gave the Conservatives a workable majority of 44 for the country's first female Prime Minister. The Conservative victory in 1979 also marked a change in government which would continue for 18 years, including the entire 1980s, until the Labour victory of 1997. It marked a period of political stability in the United Kingdom following four changes of government in the space of 15 years. Although the Conservatives would go on to win more seats under Thatcher in 1983 and 1987, and again under Boris Johnson in 2019, the Tories have never since matched the 43.9% of the popular vote they recorded in 1979.

The SNP saw a massive collapse in support, losing 9 of its 11 MPs. The Liberal Party had a disappointing election; its scandal-hit former leader Jeremy Thorpe lost his seat in North Devon to the Conservatives.

:

|-
|+ style="caption-side: bottom; font-weight:normal" |All parties shown.
|}

Votes summary

Seats summary

Incumbents defeated

See also 
 List of MPs elected in the 1979 United Kingdom general election
 1979 United Kingdom local elections
 1979 United Kingdom general election in England
 1979 United Kingdom general election in Northern Ireland
 1979 United Kingdom general election in Scotland

Notes

References

Sources

Further reading

External links 
United Kingdom election results—summary results 1885–1979

Manifestos 
Conservative manifesto, 1979, 1979 Conservative Party manifesto
The Labour Way is the Better Way, 1979 Labour Party manifesto
The Real Fight is for Britain, 1979 Liberal Party manifesto

 
1979
United Kingdom general election
general election
United Kingdom general election
Margaret Thatcher
James Callaghan